Andrew Burton (born 28 October 1974 in Waratah, Tasmania) is an Australian half-pipe snowboarder. He competed in the 2006 Winter Olympics and placed 34th and 26th in his qualification runs. He ranked 32nd out of 44 competitors and did not make the final.

References

Australian male snowboarders
Olympic snowboarders of Australia
Snowboarders at the 2006 Winter Olympics
Sportsmen from Tasmania
Living people
1974 births